Team eventing equestrian at the 2014 Asian Games was held in Dream Park Equestrian Venue , Incheon, South Korea from December 24 to September 26, 2014.

Schedule
All times are Korea Standard Time (UTC+09:00)

Results
Legend
EL — Eliminated
RT — Retired
WD — Withdrawn

References

Results

External links
Official website

Team eventing